HMS Portia was a  which served with the Royal Navy during the First World War. The M class were an improvement on the previous , capable of higher speed. Launched on 10 August 1916. Portia initially served with the Grand Fleet but was allocated to convoy escort duties in early 1917. The vessel was particularly active in anti-submarine warfare, although Portia never successful sank a submarine. After the Armistice of 11 November 1918, the ship was placed in reserve before being decommissioned and sold to be broken up on 9 May 1921.

Design and development
Portia was one of eighteen s ordered by the British Admiralty in February 1915 as part of the Fifth War Construction Programme. The M-class was an improved version of the earlier  destroyers, designed to reach a higher speed in order to counter rumoured German fast destroyers.

Armament consisted of three  Mk IV QF guns on the ship's centreline, with one on the forecastle, one aft on a raised platform and one between the middle and aft funnels. A single 2-pounder (40 mm) pom-pom anti-aircraft gun was carried, while torpedo armament consisted of two twin mounts for  torpedoes. Portia had a complement of 76 officers and ratings.

Construction and career
Portia was laid down by Scotts Shipbuilding and Engineering Company of Greenock with the yard number 475 in May 1915, launched on 10 August the following year and completed on 24 October. The ship was named after Portia from William Shakespeare's The Merchant of Venice. It was the second time that the name had been used, the preceding vessel having been launched more than a century before in 1810. The vessel was initially deployed as part of the Grand Fleet, joining the Fifteenth Destroyer Flotilla.

Portia was transferred from the Grand Fleet on 23 January 1917 and allocated to anti-submarine operations after the German navy declared unrestricted submarine warfare in February 1917. The search did not find anything. Also common were escort duties to protect convoys of merchant ships. Sometimes the operations did not deter the attackers, as on 17 May when the submarine  attacked a seven-ship convoy which the destroyer was escorting and sank one, a Swedish vessel. Others were more successful, such as Convoy HH13 of thirteen ships which came through without loss.

After the Armistice of 11 November 1918 the Royal Navy returned to a peacetime level of mobilisation, and surplus vessels were placed in reserve. Portia was initially transferred to Devenport on 12 December 1919 until being decommissioned and sold to Thos. W. Ward in Milford Haven on 9 May 1921. The ship was subsequently broken up.

Pennant numbers

References

Citations

Bibliography

 
 
 
 
 
 
 
 
 
 
 

1916 ships
Admiralty M-class destroyers
Ships built on the River Clyde
World War I destroyers of the United Kingdom